State Route 206 (SR 206) is a north–south state highway in central Ohio, a U.S. state.

Route description
State Route 206 passes through the northwestern quadrant of Coshocton County and enters into the southwestern corner of Holmes County.  There are no segments of State Route 206 that are included within the National Highway System.

History
State Route 206 was established in 1924.  Its original path followed the current stretch of State Route 229 from Mount Vernon east to its eastern terminus at U.S. Route 36, and U.S. Route 36 for a short distance from State Route 229 to the current western junction of U.S. Route 36 and State Route 206.  Two years later, State Route 206 was re-aligned.  Now, State Route 206 followed the current State Route 541 from Martinsburg to the current southern terminus of State Route 206, and then the current routing of State Route 206 from that point northerly to the eastern junction of what is now State Route 715 (then known as State Route 42).

In 1935, State Route 206 was shortened, as the portion along what is now State Route 541 was re-designated as State Route 271.  At this point, the highway now ran from its current southern terminus to the eastern State Route 715 junction, which as of 1935 was designated as U.S. Route 36.  Then, in 1937, State Route 206 took on its current shape as it was extended northerly to its current northern terminus at U.S. Route 62 east of Brinkhaven.

Major intersections

References

206
Transportation in Coshocton County, Ohio
Transportation in Holmes County, Ohio